IBM Netezza (pronounced ne-teez-a) is a subsidiary of American technology company IBM that designs and markets high-performance data warehouse appliances and advanced analytics applications for uses including enterprise data warehousing, business intelligence, predictive analytics and business continuity planning.

Netezza was acquired by IBM on September 20, 2010 and reached end of support in June 2019. It was later reintroduced in June 2020 as part of the IBM CloudPak for Data offering.

History

Netezza was founded in 1999 by Foster Hinshaw. In 2000 Jit Saxena joined Hinshaw as co-founder. The company was incorporated in Delaware on December 30, 1999 as Intelligent Data Engines, Inc. and changed its name to Netezza Corporation in November 2000. Netezza announced the industry's first "data warehouse appliance" in 2003 to meet the industry's need to make use of the rapidly increasing ability to collect consumer data. In July 2007, Netezza Corporation had its initial public offering under the ticker “NZ” on NYSE Arca.

Hinshaw coined the term "data warehouse appliance" to describe a product of shared nothing parallel nodes specifically targeted for high data volumes for modern data analytics.
He left Netezza to found Dataupia in 2005.

Netezza software was based on PostgreSQL 7.2, but did not maintain compatibility.
 
Jim Baum was appointed CEO of Netezza in January, 2008 after co-founder Jit Saxena announced his retirement. Baum started at Netezza as chief operating officer in 2006. Prior to joining Netezza, Baum was president and CEO of Endeca in Boston for five years.

IBM and Netezza on September 20, 2010 announced they entered into a definitive agreement for IBM to acquire Netezza in a cash transaction at a price of $27 per share or at a net price of approximately $1.7 billion, after adjusting for cash.

Products

TwinFin, Netezza’s primary product, is designed for rapid analysis of data volumes scaling into petabytes. The company introduced the fourth generation of the TwinFin product in August 2009. Netezza introduced a scaled-down version of this appliance under the Skimmer brand in January 2010.

In February 2010, Netezza announced that it had opened up its systems to support major programming models, including Hadoop, MapReduce, Java, C++, and Python models. Netezza's partners predicted to leverage this analytic application support are Tibco Spotfire, MicroStrategy, Pursway, DemandTec and QuantiSense.

The company also markets specialized appliances for retail, spatial, complex analytics and regulatory compliance needs. Netezza sells software-based products for migrating from Oracle Exadata and for implementing data virtualization and federation (data abstraction) schemes.

The Netezza appliance was the foundation of IBM Db2 Analytics Accelerator (IDAA).

In 2012 the products were re-branded as IBM PureData for Analytics.

In 2017, IBM replaced Netezza with the Integrated Analytics System  using Power-8 processing frame and Db2 as the database engine in an offering called Db2 Warehouse. It featured both row-based and columnar storage plus high-speed flash drives. The Db2 Warehouse engine runs both on the cloud or on-prem.

In 2019, after acquiring Red Hat, IBM established Cloud Pak offerings based on OpenShift, and revived Netezza as Netezza Performance Server under Cloud Pak for Data, both of which could run on-prem or on the cloud. The offering is a 64-bit NPS with flash drives and optimized FPGAs. The revived NPS is 100 percent identical in feature compatibility to Netezza Mako, and moving to this platform required only an nzmigrate or nzbackup/restore.

In 2020, the first Netezza Performance Server in the cloud was GA on Amazon Web Services. This offering uses the actual AMPP Netezza Hardware, not commodity hardware running Netezza software. Migrating to this platform also requires only an nzmigrate or nzbackup/restore through an S3 bucket. It is a direct competitor to Amazon's Red Shift database. It is also available in Azure and IBM Cloud.

Technology

Netezza’s proprietary AMPP (Asymmetric Massively Parallel Processing) architecture is a two-tiered system designed to quickly handle very large queries from multiple users.

The first tier is a high-performance Linux SMP host that compiles data query tasks received from business intelligence applications, and generates query execution plans. It then divides a query into a sequence of sub-tasks, or snippets that can be executed in parallel, and distributes the snippets to the second tier for execution.

The second tier consists of one to hundreds of snippet processing blades, or S-Blades, where all the primary processing work of the appliance is executed. The S-Blades are intelligent processing nodes that make up the massively parallel processing (MPP) engine of the appliance. Each S-Blade is an independent server that contains multi-core Intel-based CPUs and Netezza’s proprietary multi-engine, high-throughput FPGAs. The S-Blade is composed of a standard blade-server combined with a special Netezza Database Accelerator card that snaps alongside the blade. Each S-Blade is, in turn, connected to multiple disk drives processing multiple data streams in parallel in TwinFin or Skimmer.

AMPP employs industry-standard interfaces (SQL, ODBC, JDBC, OLE DB) and provides load times in excess of 2 TB/hour and backup/restore data rates of more than 4 TB/hour.

In 2009, the company transitioned from PowerPC processors to Intel CPUs. In August, 2009, with the introduction of the 4th generation TwinFin product, Netezza moved from proprietary blades to IBM blades.

Recognition and criticism

Netezza was added to Gartner’s Magic Quadrant for DBMS in January, 2009.

Netezza was mentioned in "The Spy Files", released by the controversial whistleblower organization WikiLeaks. The file claims Netezza bought a copy of The Geospatial Toolkit, a location-based analytic software from The Intelligent Integration Systems, Inc., "allegedly reverse engineered the code and sold a hacked version to the Central Intelligence Agency for use in remotely piloted drone aircraft". It goes on to state, "IISI, which says that the software could be wrong by a distance of up to 40 feet, sued Netezza to prevent the use of this software. Company founder Rich Zimmerman stated in court that his 'reaction was one of stun, amazement that they (CIA) want to kill people with my software that doesn’t work.'"

References

External links
 Official Home Page

Companies listed on the New York Stock Exchange
Data warehousing products
Information technology companies of the United States
Companies based in Massachusetts
IBM acquisitions